North Upper Saxon is a Central German dialect spoken in Eastern Germany. It borders to Upper Saxon German, Lusatian dialects, South Marchian dialect, Thuringian dialect and Brandenburgisch.

It is spoken in an area excluding Leipzig.

References

Central German languages
German dialects